Shadows is the ninth studio album by Scottish alternative rock band Teenage Fanclub, released on 31 May 2010 on the band's own PeMa label in Europe and on Merge Records in North America. It is the band's first new album release in five years. The album contains twelve songs: four written by Gerard Love, four by Norman Blake, and four by Raymond McGinley. Blake's "Baby Lee" was released as a single.

The liner notes credit David McGowan as a member, and he has been a constant tour fixture since 2004, playing keyboards, additional guitars and the slide guitar.

Recording
The five-year gap between Shadows and the band's previous album Man-Made was not completely intentional, according to guitarist Raymond McGinley: "We decided to take some time before we recorded anything to just do other stuff for a time, individually, and that ended up being a lot longer than we initially planned." He added, "We didn't take very long to record the actual album, it was all pretty much done back in 2008, but we did take our time mixing it and then had another break after it just to let it mature for a while before we dealt with all the stuff that goes along with releasing an album."

Critical reception

Shadows received favorable reviews from music critics. At Metacritic, which assigns a normalized rating out of 100 to reviews from critics, the album received an average score of 81, which indicates "universal acclaim", based on 18 reviews. Matt Collar of AllMusic found the "sparkling and reflective" album a worthy follow-up to Man-Made, and concluded by writing "If the day [described in "Today Never Ends"] is as sun-drenched and relaxed as the songs on Shadows implies, then may it and Teenage Fanclub go on and on." Noel Murray of The A.V. Club wrote "This is a work of rare craft, from a band now inclined to leave behind something timelessly beautiful."

Spin named Shadows the 40th best album of 2010.

Track listing

Personnel
Credits for Shadows are adapted from AllMusic and the album liner notes.

Teenage Fanclub
Norman Blake – guitar, vocals
Gerard Love – bass, vocals
Francis Macdonald – drums
Raymond McGinley – guitar, vocals
David McGowan – keyboards, guitar

Additional musicians
Euros Childs – backing vocals (2, 8), piano (5)
Tom Crossley – flute (1)
John McCusker – strings

Technical
Nick Brine – engineer, mixing
Andy Bell – assistant engineer
Dave Pye – assistant engineer
Steve Rooke – mastering
Toby Paterson – artwork
Robert Dallas Gray – layout

References

Teenage Fanclub albums
2010 albums